Mound Road Engine was a Chrysler automobile engine factory in Detroit. Chrysler purchased the Mound Road Engine Plant from the Briggs Manufacturing Company in 1953. The plant was closed by DaimlerChrysler in 2002, with production shifting to the Mack Avenue Engine Complex.

The factory had been home to Chrysler's production of the Chrysler A engine that was a small block V8 installed in Plymouth vehicles, then later the Chrysler LA engine V8, or the  "Light A", as the older "A" engine it was closely based on was nearly 50 pounds heavier. Later the location built the V10 engines. The factory was in operation for 47 years.

The facility was torn down in late 2003 and the land paved over because it was cheaper to pay taxes on a parking lot than an empty building. The newly paved area, as well as the old employee parking lots, are now used to store vehicles that were manufactured at Warren Truck Assembly before shipping them to dealerships.

Mount Elliott Tool and Die, another Chrysler facility, is located directly behind what used to be the Mound Road Engine plant. The facility was located at 20300 Mound Road, Detroit, Michigan.

References

Chrysler factories
Industrial buildings and structures in Detroit
Motor vehicle assembly plants in Michigan
1953 establishments in Michigan